Manish Gupta is an Indian film director and writer in Bollywood. Manish has directed five (5) movies – 420 IPC (2021), Rahasya (2015), Hostel (2011), The Stoneman Murders (2009) and Darna Zaroori Hai (2006). And he has written the Screenplay and Dialogues for the movies Sarkar (2005) and Section 375 (2019) amongst many others.

Career
Manish started his career as a screenwriter. Amitabh Bachchan-starrer Sarkar was Manish's first film. Manish bagged several award nominations for the screenplay and dialogues of Sarkar.

Manish debuted as a director with Darna Zaroori Hai (2006) in which there were six different stories and a separate director for each story. Manish directed the main story titled ‘Grandma narrates stories to five children’.

Manish's next film as director was the critically acclaimed The Stoneman Murders (2009) starring Kay Kay Menon and Arbaaz Khan, based on the infamous Stoneman killings that shook Bombay in 1983.

After that, Manish directed Hostel (2011) about students’ deaths due to ragging  (hazing) inside college hostels. Manish was felicitated for making this socially relevant film by the then President of India, Ms. Pratibha Patil.

Manish's next film as director was the critically acclaimed Rahasya (2015) based on the Aarushi Talwar murder case, starring Kay Kay Menon, Tisca Chopra and Ashish Vidyarthi. Rahasya had a long run of many weeks in theatres across India.

Manish's next film was the 2019 film Section 375, a courtroom drama about a fake rape case, which took Manish three years to research and script. For his script of Section 375, Manish was nominated for a Filmfare award under the Best Screenplay category at the 65th Filmfare Awards 2020.

Manish's latest release is the 2021 film 420 IPC, a courtroom drama about an economics offence. The film starring Vinay Pathak, Ranvir Shorey, Gul Panag and Rohan Vinod Mehra released on OTT platform ZEE5 to positive reviews and ranked as the 4th most viewed movie/series on Indian OTT platforms during the week of 13th Dec.-19th Dec. 2021.  

Manish's next upcoming film is One Friday Night starring female superstar Raveena Tandon. The film's shooting is complete and the film is currently under post-production. The film is slated for a 2022 release.

Manish specializes in writing and directing suspense dramas and over the years has developed his unique genre wherein he takes details of a real case and weaves them into an intriguing suspense film.

Filmography

Director
420 IPC (2021)
Rahasya (2015)
Hostel (2011)
The Stoneman Murders (2009)
Darna Zaroori Hai (2006)

Screenplay and Dialogues
Sarkar (2005)
Section 375 (2019)

References

 Research is the backbone of Manish Gupta's 420 IPC say producers, 21.12.21.
 Manish Gupta’s 420 IPC promises to be a gripping courtroom drama - Bombay Times,17.12.21 
 420 IPC REVIEW : 420 IPC MAKES AN ENGAGING WATCH - Times Of India,17.12.21 
 Raveena Tandon's True Potential Remains Untapped says Director Manish Gupta - Mid Day, 19.12.21
 Raveena Tandon In Manish Gupta’s Thriller - Spotboye, 30.08.21
Manish Gupta all set to Direct next two films
Manish Gupta wrote 'SECTION 375' three years ago - Mumbai Mirror 11th Sept 2019
Director - Manish Gupta's interview with Bombay Times; 1st Oct 2019
Youtube Interview Mid-day 18th Sept 2019
 Mistaken Identity
 Rahasya’s extended run
 Manish Gupta’s next is Sinhasan
 No one signed for Sinhasan
 Manish Gupta interview, 3 February 2009
 Times of India Movie Reviews
 The-new-Aarushi
 Murder they wrote
 Murders continue to fascinate filmmakers
Tisca to play Nupur Talwar
Sakshi sem as aarushi in Rahasya
manish gupta finds his aarushi
Aarushi
Rahasya
A sad ending?
Bollywood script matches Aarushi verdict
Can Bollywood handle the Truth
Bombay Times 3 Dec Page 1
The big question: Truth or Fiction
Rahasya is not a portrayal of authentic events

Hindi-language film directors
Living people
Film directors from Mumbai
Indian male screenwriters
Year of birth missing (living people)